Richard D. Lineback (born February 4, 1952) is an American actor who appeared in the films Speed, Twister and Varsity Blues. He played Deputy Dodd in Friday the 13th: A New Beginning.

Lineback has appeared in many roles on the stage, with leads that include Tom Joad in The Grapes of Wrath, C.C. Showers in The Diviners, for which he won the Drama-Logue Award for Outstanding Actor, and the title role in Mister Roberts.

He has also made numerous guest appearances for television, including Romas in Star Trek: The Next Generation, Selin Peers in Star Trek: Deep Space Nine and Kessick in Star Trek: Enterprise. He also appeared as the Rev. Vernon Canty in two episodes of JAG.  He also appeared in two episodes of M*A*S*H, playing different characters.

Early life
Lineback was born in Frankfurt as the son of American parents Carl Mayo Lineback (1922–2004) and Dorothy Anne Darnall (1923–2008). His siblings are Robert B. Lineback (born 1953) and Carol A. Lineback (born 1955). His father was a physician and an officer in the U.S. Army assigned to the 97th General Hospital in Frankfurt. When he retired from active military service in 1965, Dr. Lineback relocated with his family to Austin, Texas, where he established a private practice.

Richard Lineback graduated from John H. Reagan High School in Austin in 1970, where he appeared in several student theatrical productions. After attending the University of Texas at Austin., he moved to Los Angeles, California to pursue an acting career.

Career
In 1975, Lineback joined the Colony Theatre Company in Burbank, and was in the cast of the play The Grass Harp. He appeared in many stage roles, including those of Eugene Gant in Look Homeward, Angel; Tom Joad in The Grapes of Wrath; C.C. Showers in The Diviners, for which he won the Drama-Logue Award for Outstanding Actor; Dan White in Execution of Justice; and the title role in Mister Roberts.

His film debut was the role of Steve Estes in the biopic/drama Joni (1980), the story of Joni Eareckson. He played Larry in the western/drama Hard Country (1981) with Jan-Michael Vincent and Kim Basinger; then played Deputy Dodd in the slasher/horror film Friday the 13th: A New Beginning (1985).

His many television guest appearances include episodes of The Love Boat, M*A*S*H, The Waltons, Crazy Like a Fox, T. J. Hooker, Knight Rider, Matlock, Star Trek: The Next Generation, Hunter, China Beach, Dallas, Star Trek: Deep Space Nine, NYPD Blue, Touched by an Angel, Star Trek: Enterprise and JAG. He also played Billy in the Incident In a Small Jail segment of the television film Alfred Hitchcock Presents (1985), and played scheming businessman Wally Butler in the 1986 TV film Return to Mayberry.

Lineback appeared as Al LeFauve in the world premiere stage production of Baby Dance, co-starring Linda Purl and Stephanie Zimbalist, at the Pasadena Playhouse, and was nominated for the Los Angeles Drama Critics Circle Award for Best Actor for his performance. He later reprised the role at the Williamstown Theatre Festival in Massachusetts, and the Long Wharf Theatre in New Haven.

In the film Natural Born Killers (1994), Lineback's character, Sonny, was the first redneck to be shot to death by the murderous couple Mickey Knox (played by Woody Harrelson) and Mallory Knox (played by Juliette Lewis). In Twister (1996), his character, Mr. Thornton (Jo Harding's father), was the victim of a raging tornado. He played an FBI special agent, McMurphy, in the crime/thriller The Jackal (1997) with Bruce Willis, Richard Gere and Sidney Poitier.

Lineback recreated his performance as Al LeFauve for the Showtime film The Baby Dance (1998) co-starring Stockard Channing and Laura Dern. He played the innkeeper in the horror film The Ring (2002) featuring Naomi Watts and Martin Henderson.

Lineback resides in Los Angeles.

Filmography

Film

Television

References

External links

Richard Lineback at the Colony Theatre Website

1952 births
Living people
American male film actors
American male television actors
American male stage actors
Male actors from Austin, Texas
Male actors from Los Angeles